Nuria Roca Granell (Moncada, Valencia, 23 March 1972) is a Spanish writer, TV presenter, actress, radio announcer and architect.

In 1993 she finished her studies at the Universidad Politécnica de Valencia In 1999 she hosted the TV programme ¿Cuánto cuesta?. Between 2003 and 2005 she presented La isla de los famosos on Antena 3 and in 2004 UHF.

In 2017 she started to present the TV program Fantastic Duo in La 1. In December 2017 she returned to Cuatro after being seven years out Mediaset España and she presented the dating show Singles XD. The program was cancelled the same month after thirteen episodes due to the low share.

In September 2018 she became a team member in the Spanish talk show El hormiguero.

Personal life
She got married with the writer and businessman Juan del Val and they keep an open marriage. She has a son named Juan born in 2002, a son named Pau born in 2006 and a daughter named Olivia born in 2010.

Filmography
 El hombre de tu vida (2016) as Lucía
 La que se avecina (2014) Lidia
 Aída (2014) as Claudia
 Calabazas (2013) as Berta Sandoval
 Saturday Night Live (2009) as Bellísima
 Javier ya no vive solo (2002–2003) as Sofía Castelló
 7 vidas (2001) as Clara Romero

References

External links

 

1972 births
Spanish television actresses
Spanish game show hosts
Spanish women radio presenters
Spanish radio presenters
Architects from the Valencian Community
Writers from the Valencian Community
Actresses from the Valencian Community
Telecinco
Technical University of Valencia alumni
Living people
21st-century Spanish actresses